Kitty Bugge (born 1878, died 1938) was a Norwegian feminist and union leader. She served as the 12th President of the Norwegian Association for Women's Rights from 1935 to 1936. Bugge also founded the National Union of Female Telegraph Operators and served as its first President from 1914 to 1919 and again from 1921 to 1933. She was a board member of the Union of State Employees from 1923 to 1930. Bugge was a sister of the noted feminist, lawyer and diplomat Anna Bugge.

References

Norwegian women's rights activists
1878 births
1938 deaths
Norwegian feminists
Norwegian trade unionists
20th-century Norwegian politicians
20th-century Norwegian women politicians
Norwegian Association for Women's Rights people